Abaciscus tristis is a species of moth belonging to the family Geometridae, and the type species of the genus Abaciscus. It was described by Arthur Gardiner Butler in 1889. It is known from the Himalaya, western and southern China, Taiwan and Borneo.

It is infrequent in upper montane forest, ranging from 1,000 to 2,000 meters.

References

Boarmiini
Moths described in 1889
Moths of Asia